Full Metal Furies is an action adventure video game developed and published by Cellar Door Games. Announced in February 2017, it was released on January 17, 2018 for Microsoft Windows and Xbox One.

Development
After Cellar Door Gamess success with Rogue Legacy, the development for Full Metal Furies commenced. It had been in development for three years before it was announced on February 20, 2017. The game was released onto Microsoft Windows and Xbox One on January 17, 2018.

Reception

The game received a Metacritic score of 75 and 85 on Xbox One and PC platforms, respectively, indicating generally favorable reviews. Despite the reviews, the game failed to break even, causing Cellar Door Games to describe it as "a pretty massive failure".

References

External links
 

Action video games
2018 video games
Indie video games
Adventure games
Nintendo Switch games
Video games developed in Canada
Windows games
Xbox One games
Multiplayer and single-player video games
Cooperative video games